Sergio Vega may refer to:
 Sergio Vega (bassist), American bassist and songwriter
 Sergio Vega (singer) (1969–2010), Mexican banda singer, "El Shaka"